FQPL Northern is the top association football league in the region of North Queensland. The current clubs are from Townsville, Ingham, and Ayr. Currently, FQPL Northern is in the fourth tier of football in Australia, the third tier of football in Queensland. The league is officially governed by Football Queensland North, and is overwatched by Football Queensland, the governing body for football in Queensland. The clubs compete in a regular season generally from April to September, and consist of a finals series.

The league was previously known as the North Queensland Premier League, before the Football Queensland Future of Football 2020+ reforms.

Current Clubs
2022 Season 
As of 2022, FQPL Northern currently consists of the following clubs:

Plans are currently being made to add NQ Congo United and Wulguru United back into top tier competitions.

Past Champions
Despite there being premier competitions since the early twentieth century, results for this competition have only been tracked since 2011.

Reference List

External links
 
 Football Queensland North Official Website

Football Queensland
North Queensland
Soccer leagues in Queensland
Sports leagues established in 2005
2005 establishments in Australia